BKJ may refer to:

Barkur railway station, Barkur, India, Indian Railways station code
Beckenham Junction station, London, National Rail station code
Boké Baralande Airport, Boké, Guinea, IATA airport code
Pande language, Central African Republic, ISO 639-3 code